Hristo Marinov (born March 14, 1987, Stara Zagora) is a male wrestler from Bulgaria.  He competes in men's -84 kg Greco-Roman wrestling.

At the 2012 Summer Olympics he was knocked out after his first match which he lost to Kazakh wrestler Daniyal Gadzhiyev.

References

External links
 bio on fila-wrestling.com

Living people
1987 births
Bulgarian male sport wrestlers
Olympic wrestlers of Bulgaria
Wrestlers at the 2012 Summer Olympics
World Wrestling Championships medalists
Sportspeople from Stara Zagora
European Wrestling Championships medalists
20th-century Bulgarian people
21st-century Bulgarian people